Kim Yeo-jin (born June 24, 1972) is a South Korean actress and activist. Kim made her acting debut in the stage play What Do Women Live For in 1995, and has since remained active in film and television, drawing praise for her supporting roles in Im Sang-soo's Girls' Night Out (1998), Lee Chang-dong's Peppermint Candy (2000), and Im Kwon-taek's Chi-hwa-seon (2002). In 2021, she played the notable role, Choi Myung-hee, a corrupt and manipulative lawyer in Vincenzo

Personal life
Kim Yeo-jin met her future husband director Kim Jin-min in 2003 on the set of Forever Love. They married in February 2004.

Kim is known for being actively engaged in various rallies and civic group activities, attracting public attention to controversial social and political issues, including efforts to reinstate laid-off shipbuilders at Hanjin Heavy Industries, calls to lower university tuition fees, and opposition to the Four Major Rivers Project. She often expresses her opinions on social networking service Twitter, and has been called one of the most popular socialtainers.

Because of her outspokenness, MBC banned Kim in 2011 (she was originally scheduled to appear as a "progressive" panelist on the current affairs radio show Sohn Suk-hee's Spotlight), which led to prominent figures from academic, literary and media circles to call for a boycott of the network's programs.

Kim has also campaigned for liberal politicians Roh Moo-hyun, Moon Jae-in and Park Won-soon.

Filmography

Film

Television series

Theater

Books 
 배운 녀자 (2011) 
 내가 걸은만큼 내 인생이다 (2011) 
 Love Song  (2012)

Awards

References

External links 
  
 Kim Yeo-jin at Momma Entertainment 
 Kim Yeo-jin Fan Cafe at Daum 
 
 
 

South Korean television actresses
South Korean film actresses
South Korean stage actresses
Ewha Womans University alumni
Gimhae Kim clan
1972 births
Living people
People from Changwon